The 2008 Fed Cup was the 46th edition of the most important competition between national teams in women's tennis.

The final took place at the Club de Campo Villa de Madrid in Madrid, Spain, on 13–14 September. The home team, Spain, lost to the defending champion Russia, 0–4, giving Russia their fourth title in five years.

World Group

Draw

World Group play-offs

The four losing teams in the World Group first round ties (France, Germany, Israel and Italy), and four winners of the World Group II ties (Argentina, Czech Republic, Japan and Ukraine) entered the draw for the World Group play-offs.

Date: 26–27 April

World Group II

The World Group II is the second highest level of Fed Cup competition in 2008. Winners advanced to the World Group play-offs, and losers played in the World Group II play-offs.

Date: 2–3 February

World Group II play-offs

The four losing teams from World Group II (Croatia, Slovakia, Belgium and Austria) played off against qualifiers from Zonal Group I. Two teams qualified from Europe/Africa Zone (Serbia and Switzerland), one team from the Asia/Oceania Zone (Uzbekistan), and one team from the Americas Zone (Colombia).

Date: 26–27 April

Americas Zone

 Nations in bold advanced to the higher level of competition.
 Nations in italics were relegated down to a lower level of competition.

Group I
Venue: Club Deportivo El Rodeo, Medellín, Colombia (outdoor clay)

Dates: 30 January – 2 February

Participating Teams

Group II
Venue: Country Club Cochabamba, Cochabamba, Bolivia (outdoor clay)

Dates: 23–26 April

Participating Teams

 
 
 
 
 
 
 
 
 
 
 
 
 

 withdrawn: Costa Rica, Jamaica, Peru

Asia/Oceania Zone

Group I
Venue: National Tennis Development Centre, Bangkok, Thailand (outdoor hard)

Dates: 30 January – 2 February

Participating Teams

Group II
Venue: National Tennis Development Centre, Bangkok, Thailand (outdoor hard)

Dates: 30 January – 2 February

Participating Teams

 
 
 
 
 
 
 

 withdrawn: Jordan

Europe/Africa Zone

Group I
Venue: SYMA Sportközpont, Budapest, Hungary (indoor carpet)

Dates: 30 January – 2 February

Participating Teams

Group II
Venue: Coral Tennis Club, Tallinn, Estonia (indoor hard)

Dates: 30 January – 2 February

Participating Teams

Group III
Venue: Master Class Tennis and Fitness Club, Yerevan, Armenia (outdoor clay)

Dates: 22–26 April

Participating Teams

 
 
 
 
 
 
 
 
 
 
 

 withdrawn: Liechtenstein, Malta

Rankings
The rankings were measured after the three points during the year that play took place, and were collated by combining points earned from the previous four years.

References

External links 
 Fed Cup

 
Billie Jean King Cups by year
Fed Cup
2008 in women's tennis